John Pelling may refer to:

John Pelling (artist) (born 1930), British artist and clergyman
John Pelling (canon), (born 1668), British clergyman and Canon of Windsor
John Pelling (fencer) (born 1936), British fencer